Václav Svoboda (born 16 September 1999) is a Czech footballer who plays as a right-back.

Club career
Svoboda made his professional Czech First League debut for 1. FK Příbram against FK Teplice on 22 August 2020.

References

External links
 
 
 Futbalnet profile 
 

1999 births
Living people
Czech footballers
Association football defenders
FC Viktoria Plzeň players
1. FK Příbram players
FK Senica players
Czech First League players
Slovak Super Liga players
Expatriate footballers in Slovakia